William Frederick Sears (1868 – 23 March 1929) was an Irish Sinn Féin and later Cumann na nGaedheal politician.

Sears was born in Neale, County Mayo in 1868. He was elected as a Sinn Féin MP for the Mayo South constituency at the 1918 general election. In January 1919, Sinn Féin MPs refused to recognise the Parliament of the United Kingdom and instead assembled at the Mansion House in Dublin as a revolutionary parliament called Dáil Éireann, though Sears did not attend as he was in prison. He was elected unopposed as a Sinn Féin Teachta Dála (TD) for the Mayo South–Roscommon South constituency at the 1921 elections.

He supported the Anglo-Irish Treaty and voted for it. He was re-elected unopposed for the same constituency at the 1922 general election, this time as a pro-Treaty Sinn Féin TD. He was elected as a Cumann na nGaedheal TD for Mayo South constituency at the 1923 general election. He lost his seat at the June 1927 general election but was elected to the Seanad in 1928. He died in office in 1929 and the by-election for his seat was won by Sir Nugent Everard.

In 1902 he founded the Enniscorthy Echo in co-operation with Sir Thomas Esmonde.

References

External links
 

1868 births
1929 deaths
Early Sinn Féin TDs
Cumann na nGaedheal TDs
Cumann na nGaedheal senators
Members of the 1st Dáil
Members of the 2nd Dáil
Members of the 3rd Dáil
Members of the 4th Dáil
Members of the 1928 Seanad
Members of the Parliament of the United Kingdom for County Mayo constituencies (1801–1922)
UK MPs 1918–1922
Politicians from County Mayo